Kathryn Bostic is an American composer and artist known for her work on award-winning films, TV, and theater. In 2016, she became the first female African American score composer to join the Academy of Motion Picture Arts and Sciences, and was the vice president of the Alliance for Women Film Composers from 2016 to 2018.

Work 
Bostic has written scores and songs for film, television and stage, including award-winning films Toni Morrison: The Pieces I Am and Amy Tan: Unintended Memoir, for which she received an Emmy nomination. Bostic also wrote and performed the Toni Morrison: The Pieces I Am end-title song, "High Above the Water”, which was shortlisted for "Best Original Song” at the 2020 Oscars. Bostic's scores also include Sundance award-winning film Clemency (on which she also served as an Executive Producer), Rita Moreno: Just a Girl Who Decided to Go for It, HBO documentary Black Art: In the Absence of Light, and most recently, ABC's limited series Women of the Movement from Emmy-nominated showrunner, Marissa Jo Cerar.

Kathryn Bostic's compositions have been performed by the Los Angeles Philharmonic, the Pittsburgh Symphony Orchestra, and the Bangor Symphony Orchestra. She is also the first Artist-In-Residence for the MacArthur Award-winning Chicago Sinfonietta.

Bostic has also written for Broadway, most notably collaborating with the award-winning playwright August Wilson on Gem of the Ocean, various productions of his last play Radio Golf, and the Mark Taper production of Joe Turner's Come and Gone directed by Phylicia Rashad. Consequently, Bostic was asked to score the PBS American Masters program August Wilson: The Ground On Which I Stand, which ultimately inspired her composition "The Great Migration - A Symphony in Celebration of August Wilson", which received its world premiere in January 2018 by the Grammy award-winning Pittsburgh Symphony Orchestra. Bostic's work on Broadway also includes Bengal Tiger at the Baghdad Zoo with Robin Williams by Pulitzer Prize finalist Rajiv Joseph. Her score garnered a win in the sound design category for this collaboration.

As a solo artist, Bostic has toured extensively in festivals and venues including the Copenhagen Jazz Festival, Ronnie Scott's, Birdland, Tokyo and Osaka Blue Note, and The Pori Jazz Festival. Also a vocalist, Bostic has recorded and performed with many artists including Nas, Ryuichi Sakamoto, and David Byrne.

Awards and nominations

References

External links 
 Official website
 
 Kathryn Bostic on Disccogs

21st-century African-American women singers
21st-century American pianists
21st-century American women pianists
African-American film score composers
African-American pianists
American television composers
American women film score composers
American film score composers
Living people
Women television composers
Year of birth missing (living people)